Inguva Kartikeya Sarma (15 October 1937 – 29 November 2013) was an Indian archaeologist and a director of the Salar Jung Museum.

Education and career

I. K. Sarma was born in the village of Pallipadu in the Nellore district of Andhra Pradesh.  He obtained a Post Graduate Diploma in Archaeology from the School of Archaeology, the academic wing of Archaeological Survey of India (ASI) in New Delhi. In 1958, Sarma joined the Archaeological Survey of India as a technical assistant in 1958. From 1983 to 1993, he was the Superintending Archaeologist of the ASI's Excavation Branch at Nagpur. From 1993 to 1997, he served as the Director of Salar Jung Museum in Hyderabad.

Sarma was involved in excavations at several sites in Andhra Pradesh, Gujarat, Maharashtra, Rajasthan, Telangana and Tamil Nadu. These sites include Nagarjunakonda (1956–1957); Kalibangan (1960–1962 and 1964–1966); Paiyampalli (1968); Pauni (1969–1970); Surkotada (1970–1971); Amaravati and Gudimallam (1974–1975); and Pedavegi and Guntupalli (1985–1987). In the 1970s, he also surveyed the remains of a Jain site at Aretippur in Karnataka.

Personal life and death
Sarma was married, and he and his wife had two daughters and a son. During the last years of his life, he suffered from Alzheimer's disease. He died on 29 November 2013 at his home in Hyderabad,

Selected works 

Sarma's published works include:

References 

20th-century Indian archaeologists
People from Nellore district
1937 births
2013 deaths
Deaths from Alzheimer's disease
Neurological disease deaths in India
Scientists from Andhra Pradesh